This is a list of notable companies that were founded in Lincolnshire, England or have a large presence in the county as a major employer. The official headquarters or registered office may be elsewhere.

The list is split into two main sections: current companies, and defunct companies that are no longer in business in their original form.

Current companies

Headquartered in Lincolnshire
Unwins Engineering - Engineering and Fabrication
Batemans Brewery - Brewer
TWB Electrical LTD - Electrical Contracting
Bourne Publishing Group - Magazines
Clugston Group - Construction and distribution (Liquidated)
Delaine Bus Company 
Dynamic Cassette International
Eminox - Stainless steel exhaust systems
Extra (service areas) - Roadside service area operator
Falcon Cycles - Bicycle manufacturer
Findus - Frozen food
Interflora - UK arm of franchised florists selling flowers by post and retail stores
Lincs FM Group - Local radio operator
Linpac - Packaging founded in county
Nisa - Food distribution and corner shop 'brand'
Oldrids - Department store chain, including the Downtown brand
Peter Lind & Company - Builders
Ross Group - Frozen foods company
Splash About - toddler and children's swimwear brand
Stagecoach in Lincolnshire - Local operating division for Stagecoach Group (took over several local bus companies including Lincolnshire RoadCar)
Stagecoach Grimsby-Cleethorpes
Young's Bluecrest - Frozen food processors

Major presence in Lincolnshire
British Steel - Formerly Tata and Corus Group plc
Siemens - Formerly Rustons Gas Turbines

Founded in Lincolnshire
The Cheese Shop, Louth - Artisan delicatessen

Defunct companies (former)
Allis-Chalmers - Tractors and construction machinery factory
Appleby-Frodingham Steel Company - Absorbed into British Steel Corporation, now Corus
Aveling-Barford - Former engineering company based in Grantham
Aveling and Porter - Steam rollers (became Aveling-Barford)
Autocast - Non-ferrous foundry in Bourne, supplying casings to the car industry
Blackstone & Co - Blacksmiths and early engine manufacturer
BMARC - Former armaments designer and manufacturer
British Racing Motors (BRM) - Racing cars
Chandlers Oil & Gas - now owned by WCF and known as WCF Chandlers
Clayton & Shuttleworth - former steam and agricultural machinery builders
English Racing Automobiles - Former race car builder
Field Marshall - Brand of tractors built by Marshall, Sons & Co. Ltd of Gainsborough
Marshall, Sons & Co. - Former steam engine and tractor manufacturer
Priestman Brothers - Crane and excavator builders
Rinovia Steam Fishing Company Ltd. - Former fish distribution company
Richard Hornsby & Sons - Former engineering firm
Ruston (engine builder) - Former stationary engine and locomotive manufacturer
Ruston, Proctor and Company - Former steam engine builder
Ruston-Bucyrus - Former manufacturer of excavators and steam shovels
William Foster & Co. - Former agricultural engineer and steam engine builder
Think Accounting Ltd. - Former payroll and accounts firm for Hgv drivers and oil rig workers.

See also 
Top Track 100
Top Track 250

References

 
Lists of companies of the United Kingdom
Companies